Czyżewo may refer to the following places:
Czyżewo, Kuyavian-Pomeranian Voivodeship (north-central Poland)
Czyżewo, Lubusz Voivodeship (west Poland)
Czyżewo, West Pomeranian Voivodeship (north-west Poland)